Barr Beacon School, formerly Barr Beacon Language College, is a mixed secondary school in Walsall, England, which acquired Academy status in 2011, when it readopted the school's original name: Barr Beacon School. It takes this name from the adjacent hill, Barr Beacon. The school was designated a specialist Language College in September 2003 but does not have this designation today. It has over 1500 pupils, including a sixth form of approximately 200.

History 
The school was built to serve the adjacent Pheasey Estate, and opened in 1958 under the same headmastership as Aldridge Grammar School. In 1960 it had its own headmaster, Mr. Tyas, Deputy Head, Mr Brown, as an 11-15 plus 1 year GCE O Level secondary modern school for 300 pupils before converting to a 13-18 comprehensive in September 1972 under the reorganisation of schools in Aldridge-Brownhills, the urban district that was absorbed into the Metropolitan Borough of Walsall in 1974. However, it was reorganised into an 11-18 school in September 1986, and has retained that age range ever since.

Subjects 
Subjects studied at Barr Beacon: English Literature, English Language, mathematics, German, French, Spanish, biology, physics, chemistry, computer science, history, geography, psychology, dance, drama, art, textiles, child development, physical education, health and social care, media studies.

Construction 
The building was initially planned and constructed by Ian Woodley Associates with surveying and mapping of the area completed by P. O'Connor and sons. Actual construction beginning  in March 1951. Actual construction was completed by an amalgamation of Ian Woodley Associates, Gaz Baldwyn-Jolly plastering limited and Whalley Forklift rentals. The first building (currently A block) was completed before schedule in late 1952 and the final block originally planned (currently D block) being completed on time in 1958 ready for teaching in the same year. Once the first canteen (located in A block) was built the kitchen was furnished by N. Burnett & Co. catering suppliers to provide food for staff and students at the school.

School performance

The school was judged Outstanding in its Ofsted inspection of 2014. As of 2023, its most recent inspection was in November 2022, with an outcome of Good.

References

External links
 

Academies in Walsall
Secondary schools in Walsall
Educational institutions established in 1954
1954 establishments in England